Seh Asiab (also Romanized as Seh Āsīāb; also known as Seh Āsīābeh) is a village in Kuhdasht-e Jonubi Rural District, in the Central District of Kuhdasht County, Lorestan Province, Iran. At the 2006 census, its population was 236, in 48 families.

References 

Towns and villages in Kuhdasht County